The Eastern Coast of Cantabria is a comarca  (shire, but with no administrative role) in the autonomous community of Cantabria, northern Spain, that comprises the municipalities of  Colindres, Laredo, Liendo and Castro Urdiales.

Municipalities

There are 4 municipalities comprising the comarca, listed below with their areas and populations:

References

East Coast
Green Spain